Uxbridge High School is the only public high school in Uxbridge, Massachusetts. The school, located within the village of Ironstone, is a part of Uxbridge Public Schools system.

History
Known to have been in operation as far back as 1896, Uxbridge High School had a building designed by the architect S. Wesley Haynes on Capron Street in 1935. In 2012, the school moved to a new building at 300 Quaker Highway.

In addition to academics, Uxbridge High School offers such activities as a chapter of the National Honor Society, band, drama, and chorus, known as the Spartones.

Athletics
Home of the Spartans, Uxbridge High School athletic teams sport the colors of black and orange. The school competes within District II of the Massachusetts Interscholastic Athletic Association (MIAA). Uxbridge High offers the following sports: baseball, basketball, cheerleading, cross country, football, golf, hockey, softball, soccer, tennis, and track and field.

In 1996, the Uxbridge High School football team celebrated its centennial.

Demographics
Uxbridge High School typically enrolls around 500 students and their age groups range from grades 8 through 12. The demographics of the school are as follows: 91.5% White, 2.7% Hispanic, 2.1% African American, 1.2% Asian, and 1.9% Multiracial.

Notable alumni
 Tim Fortugno (1980), Major League Baseball player
 Albert Harkness (did not graduate), educator

See also
List of high schools in Massachusetts

References

External links

Uxbridge, Massachusetts
Public high schools in Massachusetts
Schools in Worcester County, Massachusetts